Funkerman (born 1975 in Breda, Netherlands) is a Dutch house DJ, record producer and remixer, who runs the record label Flamingo Recordings with Raf Jansen and Fedde Le Grand.

Biography
In 2005, Funkerman topped the Dutch club charts with "Rule the Night" and "The One" and in 2007 he made the Dutch Top 40, the Mega Single Top 100 and the Mega Top 50 thanks to his collaboration with Fedde Le Grand under their "F to the F" alias with "Wheels In Motion". In that same year he made the international charts with the track "Speed Up", that eventually was signed by UK based label Defected Records. In 2008, he delivered several remixes and released "3 Minutes To Explain", again a collaboration with Fedde Le Grand.

The song "Speed Up" is available as a downloadable track on the Xbox 360 karaoke game, Lips.

In May 2011, both Funkerman and Raf Jansen signed an exclusive publishing deal with Sony ATV, and started a new record label called Can You Feel It Records.

January 2015 his collaboration with Hardwell featuring I-Fan ("Where Is Here Now") was included on Hardwell's debut album United We Are.

Discography

Albums
 2010: House for All

Singles and EPs
 2002: Dragonson and Funkerman - Freakshow by Art
 2002: DJ Renegade and Funkerman - Cadillacs and Baseball Bats
 2002: Fusic - Hitz of the Glitz E.P.
 2003: DJ Renegade and Funkerman - Cuban Cigars & Bassguitars
 2003: Ard and Funkerman - Delicious
 2003: Funkerman - The Supernatural EP
 2003: Funkertracks - We Live for This
 2005: Funkerman and RAF - Rule the Night / Bryston Love
 2005: Funkerman - The One
 2006: Funkerman feat. JW - Fallin' in Love
 2006: Funkerman - Speed Up — UK #85 (charted 2008)
 2007: Funkerman and Fedde Le Grand present "F To The F" - Wheels in Motion
 2007: Fedde le Grand and Funkerman feat. Shermanology - 3 Minutes to Explain
 2008: Baggi Begovic and Funkerman - Good God
 2008: Funkerman feat. JW - One for Me
 2008: F-man - Batsen
 2009: Funkerman feat. I-Fan - Remember
 2009: Fedde le Grand and F-man - The Joker
 2009: Funkerman feat. Mitch Crown - Slide
 2009: Funkerman feat. Shermanology - Automatic
 2010: Funkerman feat. Ida Corr - Unconditional Love
 2010: Danny P Jazz, Fedde Le Grand and Funkerman - New Life
 2010: Funkerman - Brooklyn Bounce EP
 2010: Funkerman ft. Left - Speed Up Once More
 2011: Funkerman - Paperbag Revolution / Everyday
 2011: Funkerman - La Sirena EP
 2011: Funkerman - Crash Test
 2011: Funkerman - Pressure Cooker
 2011: Funkerman - Musique Non Stop
 2012: Funkerman - Blow
 2012: Funkerman - The Light
 2013: Funkerman - Paradise / Dashboardlight
 2013: Funkerman - Push 'Em Up
 2013: Funkerman - Pondifonk
 2013: Marco Lys ft. F-man - Ya Mamma
 2013: Funkerman - Wine & Roll
 2014: Funkerman ft. Jay Colin - Tune!
 2014: Funkerman - Coming Home
 2015: Hardwell and Funkerman ft. I-Fan - Where Is Here Now
 2015: Funkerman ft. J.W. - The Masterplan
 2015: Funkerman ft. J.W. - Foolish Game
 2016: Funkerman - You Got Me Weak
 2019: Funkerman and Pete Surreal - What's That
 2020: Shermanology and Funkerman - Amen

Remixes
 2003: Kruel Kutz - Blame It on the Funk
 2003: DJ Jani - Beyond Reach (Fusic RMX)
 2005: Red Drop - Music 4 Me
 2006: Conrado Martinez and Frank Rempe - Capicu
 2006: Camille Jones - The Creeps
 2007: Jesse Garcia - Off the Hook
 2007: Ricky L feat. M:ck - Born Again
 2007: Ida Corr - Let Me Think About It
 2007: Yoav - Club Thing
 2007: Eddie Thoneick Pres. Female Deejays - If Only
 2007: Ron Carroll - The Nike Song
 2008: Todd Terry All Stars - Get Down
 2008: Onionz feat. S.N.O.W. - Nothin But Love
 2008: Kaskade - Angel on My Shoulder
 2008: Jaimy and Kenny D. - Keep on Touchin' Me
 2008: Sugababes - Girls
 2009: Re-United - Sun Is Shining
 2009: Chocolate Puma feat. Shermanology - Only Love Can Save Me
 2009: Ida Corr - I Want You
 2009: Fedde le Grand feat. Mitch Crown - Let Me Be Real
 2009: Red Hot Chili Peppers - Otherside
 2009: Rune RK and Clara Sofie - Cry Out
 2009: DJ Sammy and The Majorkings - 4Love
 2009: Shermanology - The Weather
 2010: Guru Josh Project - Crying in the Rain
 2010: Technotronic - Pump Up the Jam
 2010: Robbie Rivera - We Live for the Music
 2010: Sharam Jey feat. Tommie Sunshine - The Things
 2010: Marco V ft. Khashassi - Predator
 2010: Mastiksoul - Run For Cover
 2011: Manufactured Superstars - Angry Circus
 2011: Moby - The Day
 2012: Re-United - Sun Is Shining 2012
 2013: DJ Licious & Sir-G ft. Abdou - Hide Your Love
 2013: Laid Back - White Horse
 2013: Dennis van de Geest - Bring The Noise
 2013: Razzy Bailey - I Still Hate Hate
 2014: Goose Bumps & Jason Caesar - This Life
 2014: DJ Licious - People
 2014: Keljet - Run This World
 2014: Lenny Fontana - I Don't Want You Back
 2014: Fedde le Grand & Funkerman - 3 Minutes To Explain (Fame remix)

References

External links
Official website
Flamingo Recordings Web Site
Can You Feel It Records Web Site

1975 births
Dutch DJs
Remixers
Dutch dance musicians
Dutch house musicians
Living people
People from Breda